The 16 members of the inaugural U.S.A Skateboarding National Team were announced in March, 2019. The skaters competed to qualify for Skateboarding at the 2020 Tokyo Olympic Games. Twelve American skateboarders qualified for the 2020 Olympics.

2019 National Team 
The skaters named to the 2019 USA Skateboarding National Team included:

Women's Park

Brighton Zeuner (Encinitas, CA)
Bryce Wettstein (Encinitas, CA)
Jordyn Barratt (Haleiwa, HI)
Nicole Hause (Stillwater, MN)

Men's Park

Alex Sorgente (Lake Worth, FL)
Tom Schaar (Malibu, CA)
Tristan Rennie (Rialto, CA)
Zion Wright (Jupiter, FL)

Women's Street

Alexis Sablone (Old Saybrook, CT)
Jenn Soto (Jersey City, NJ)
Leo Baker (Covina, CA)
Mariah Duran (Albuquerque, NM)

Men's Street
Chris Joslin (Hawaiian Gardens, CA)
Jagger Eaton (Mesa, AZ)
Louie Lopez (Hawthorne, CA)
Nyjah Huston (Laguna Beach, CA)

2020 Olympic Team 
Twelve American skateboarders, the maximum number allowed per country, qualified to skate on behalf of the United States at the 2020 Summer Olympics. The skaters who qualified were:

Women's Park 
 Bryce Wettstein
 Brighton Zeuner
 Jordyn Barratt

Men's Park 
 Heimana Reynolds
Cory Juneau
Zion Wright

Women's Street 
Mariah Duran
Alexis Sablone
Alana Smith

Men's Street 
Nyjah Huston
Jake Ilardi
Jagger Eaton

References

External links
 Team USA Skateboarding 2020 Olympic Representatives

National sports teams of the United States
Skateboarding